The Amazing Vagabond is a 1929 American silent Western film directed by Wallace Fox and written by Frank Howard Clark and Helen Gregg. The film stars Bob Steele, Thomas G. Lingham, Jay Morley, Perry Murdock, Lafe McKee and Thelma Daniels. The film was released on April 7, 1929, by Film Booking Offices of America.

Cast     
 Bob Steele as Jimmy Hobbs
 Thomas G. Lingham as George Hobbs 
 Jay Morley as Bill Wharton
 Perry Murdock as Haywire
 Lafe McKee as Phil Dunning
 Thelma Daniels as Alice Dunning
 Emily Gerdes as Myrtle

References

External links
 

1929 films
1929 Western (genre) films
Film Booking Offices of America films
Films directed by Wallace Fox
American black-and-white films
Silent American Western (genre) films
1920s English-language films
1920s American films